was a Japanese businesswoman and politician who was a member of the House of Councillors.

Biography
 After graduating from Tamaki Women's School in 1923, she spent one year working as a maid in an asset house for social experience.

In April 1924, she worked at the election office of Takejiro Nishioka, who was later elected to the House of Representatives in the 1924 Japanese general election a month later; the two married in October of the same year. She spent many days supporting her husband's political activities. In March 1945, the family's home in Tokyo was partially destroyed by air raids, and they were was evacuated to Unzen, Nagasaki; two months later the home was completely destroyed by air raid.

In 1948, her husband was expelled from public office, and she became the representative director of the Nagasaki Shimbun evening edition, and the managing director of the Nagasaki Min'yū Shimbun. After that, she became president of Nagasaki Min'yū Shimbun, and also served as president of Kyushu Corporation and director of Nagasaki Radio.

In 1950, her husband became Governor of Nagasaki after his ban from political office was lifted, and three years later she was requested by the Liberal Party to run for the national district in the 1953 Japanese House of Councillors election. Although she declined at first, she decided to run at the recommendation of his husband, Tsuruhei Matsuno, and Eisaku Satō.

She was elected to the House of Councillors, where she served in the welfare and construction committees, helped families of war casualties, enacting the Prostitution Prevention Act, developing a simple water supply on remote islands in Nagasaki Prefecture, and reconstructing the city of Nagasaki. She also served as both the Liberal Democratic Party's secretary and House of Councillors Accounting Director.

After her husband's death in January 1958, she decided to retire from the House of Councillors. She assumed the position of the director of the newly-created Nagasaki Shimbun Company was founded, and became its representative director and vice president, before she resigned as director in 1966.

Haru Nishioka died on 30 November 1983.

In 1963, her first-born son Takeo Nishioka was elected to the House of Councillors in the 1963 Japanese general election. Her fourth-son Kimio Nishioka was a member of the Nagasaki Prefectural Assembly. Her granddaughter  is a member of the House of Representatives.

References

衆議院・参議院編『議会制度百年史 - 貴族院・参議院議員名鑑』大蔵省印刷局、1990年。
『日本女性人名辞典〔普及版〕』日本図書センター、1998年。
『新訂 政治家人名事典 明治～昭和』日外アソシエーツ、2003年。
長崎女性史研究会編『長崎の女たち 第2集』長崎文献社、2007年。

1905 births
1983 deaths
Politicians from Nagasaki Prefecture
Female members of the House of Councillors (Japan)
Members of the House of Councillors (Japan)
20th-century Japanese businesswomen
20th-century Japanese businesspeople
20th-century Japanese politicians
20th-century Japanese women politicians
Japanese corporate directors